The Church of Nuestra Señora de Concepción in San Manuel Colohete is a Catholic church located in Honduras, built during the colonial era in the 18th century, as well as one of the oldest churches in the country.

History
The church was designed by the Guatemalan architect Don  in 1699 during the colonial period of New Spain in the Baroque architectural style. The church's construction began in 1699 and ended in 1721. It has wooden beams on its roof. In this way a town began to form around the church, and the church thus served as the parish of the town of San Manuel Colohete during the rest of the 18th and 19th centuries.

Present
Today the church remains closed to the public to prevent damage to the artistic works it possesses, many made on national soil during the colonial era. It is open to national and foreign tourists as part of the town's tourist attractions as well as being a national monument.

Description
The church features a sculptured facade with life-size statues of saints. Inside the church, the painted ceilings and gold-covered altar have been well-preserved throughout the centuries.

Rfeferences

Lempira Department
18th-century Roman Catholic church buildings in Honduras
Baroque architecture in Honduras
Roman Catholic churches completed in 1721